MapleStory Adventures was a free-to-play, 2D, side-scrolling social network game developed by the South Korean company Nexon for Facebook and launched in July 2011. MapleStory Adventures was a simplified version of MapleStory’s basic gameplay and included creating an avatar, fighting monsters and completing quests. Although the gameplay was altered for the social networking conventions and includes freemium content, the main storyline of the game remains the same. MapleStory Adventures was free to play, but players had the option of purchasing premium content. On July 31, 2013, the game was shut down and removed from Facebook.

Gameplay
MapleStory Adventures was a 2D scrolling social network game on Facebook. At the start of the game, players must create a customizable avatar and select a class. Players may choose to play as either a Warrior, a Magician, and, as of 8th March 2012, a bowman/woman or thief. During the game, players may move anywhere they wish across a 2D side scrolling representation of “Maple World.” The game was composed of “quests,” which usually consisted of killing a certain number of monsters and collecting various items that drop from their corpses. Players would receive some quests automatically, and others could be obtained by clicking on various NPCs (Non-Player Characters). By clicking on a monster, the player delivers strikes which will cause the monster a certain amount of damage, dependent upon the player’s level and the equipment they wield. Each strike costs a certain amount of energy, drawn from a pool that slowly replenishes in real time. Also, the energy bar will decrease as you take damage from monsters. As players level up, this energy gauge will grow.

Levels and skills
When a player kills a monster, various items may drop from the corpse. These include blue stars, which may be collected to increase a player’s experience level, quest items, collection items, gold coins, and “mystery boxes.” As a player's level increases, they can purchase better weapons, as well as challenge stronger monsters, obtain more crafting cauldrons, and more. As a player’s experience level rises, their power increases and they may use gold coins to purchase various skills. For higher-leveled skills, players will also need to obtain Skill Permits. Skill permits are available from monster drops and also from your friends. These skills can then be used to kill more difficult monsters in order to acquire better treasures.

Equipment and items
As a player levels up, they will have the opportunity to use gold coins to purchase various pieces of equipment that increase their attack power in the game. They may also purchase items that have purely cosmetic rare value. Other items that drop from monsters may be part of a “game collection.” Collections may be turned in for extra energy or other prizes at the shop. Monster collections, which are filled up as you slay more and more of those monsters allow you to get special powers over that monster such as the ability to tame it, the ability to summon it, and extra EXP from that monster.

Mystery boxes provide a random gift when opened. These gifts can include a quantity of gold, consumables, or cosmetic clothing which do not increase attack power, and are for fashion only.

Map
MapleStory Adventures was played on a simplified version of Maple World. Areas in MapleStory Adventures that correspond to those in the original MapleStory game Victoria Island: include Henesys, Ellinia, Perion, Kerning City, Florina Beach And Skyscraper.

Social interaction
Like other Facebook games, MapleStory Adventures incorporated social networking aspects into the gameplay. Players may invite their friends to become adventuring companions. When they accept, each person may then hire the other to fight alongside them in the game. This grants the players extra energy during monster battles.

Gifts
Players could send each other free gifts. These include items that provide extra energy, keys to open mystery boxes, or objects that allow them to access higher level skills.

Linking
In the Open Beta phase of the game, players are allowed to link their MapleStory Adventures character to their PC Version MapleStory game to gain rewards for playing the Facebook version.

Beta tests
Nexon America held a Closed Beta Test for MapleStory Adventures from June 15 to June 26, 2011. Closed Beta keys were given to those who completed a survey on the MapleStory Adventures Facebook page within a designated period. Each participant was given five keys and encouraged to use the extras to invite friends to play. Additional keys were also given out periodically to Facebook fans throughout the Closed Beta. At the end of Closed Beta, Nexon America announced that the MapleStory Adventures Open Beta would begin “at the end of July, 2011.” Open Beta began on July 27 at 4:00pm PST.

Reception
The 11-day Closed Beta for MapleStory Adventures proved popular, quickly reaching its 30,000 player cap.
MapleStory Adventures has become the fastest growing Korean social game by surpassing 3,000,000 monthly active users just seven weeks into its open beta.

References

External links

 Official MapleStory Adventures Facebook Page
 Official MapleStory Adventures Web page
 MapleStory Adventures Facebook app

2011 video games
Browser games
Facebook games
Inactive massively multiplayer online games
MapleStory
Online games
Products and services discontinued in 2013
Video games developed in South Korea